Swedish band Tiger Lou was formed in Nyköping 2001 by Rasmus Kellerman. After several EPs, the first full-length album Is My Head Still On? was released in 2004 and was followed in 2005 with The Loyal. Rasmus Kellerman is also known as Araki.

On the albums Tiger Lou is a solo project with Kellerman writing lyrics and playing nearly every instrumental part himself. Live, however, he is backed up by Erik Welén (bass), Mathias Johansson(Guitar) and Pontus Levahn (Drums).

According to Kellerman, the name Tiger Lou is taken from a character called Tiger Lu in Corey Yuen's 1993 movie Fong Sai-yuk, although he says that "no one knows where the extra O came from" on the band's official site. Kellerman has said he even considered "Ben Parker," "Karl Kellerman," and "Boy Loves Boy," for band names, however, finally deciding on Tiger Lou after watching the film Fong Sai-yuk.

Rasmus Kellerman was married to Swedish singer-songwriter Andrea Kellerman, better known as Firefox AK. They have had multiple collaborations and two children. Amicably, they divorced in 2018.

In 2004, Tiger Lou was nominated "Newcomer of the Year" at the Swedish Alternative Music Awards manifest. Their music video for "Oh Horatio", directed by Magnus Renfors, was nominated for a Swedish Grammi in the "Best Video" category.

Discography

Albums
 Is My Head Still On? (March 2004) – Startracks
 The Loyal (October 2005) – Startracks
 A Partial Print (October 2008) – Startracks
 The Wound Dresser (September 2016) – Startracks

EPs
Second Time Around (2001)
Trouble and Desire (2003)
Last Night ... (2004)
Gone Drifting (2008)
California Hauling (2015)

Singles
Oh Horatio (2004)
Sell Out (2004)
The War Between Us (2004)
The Loyal (2005)
Nixon (2006)
Until I'm There (2006)
Coalitions (2008)
Crushed By A Crowd (2008)
Homecoming #2 (2014)
Every Battle Alike (2017)
End Times (2022)

Reboot

On October 15, 2013, Kellerman announced on his website,  
Tiger Lou then went to on play multiple shows live later that year.

On October 30, 2014, Tiger Lou released a single named, "Homecoming #2" accompanied by a music video directed by Peder Bergstrand from the band, I ARE DROID. Along with the "Homecoming #2" single, a new EP was planned for release towards the end of 2015 They then played live in, Hamburg, Leipzig and Berlin March 2015.

On October 16, 2015, Tiger Lou released their five track EP called, "California Hauling"; Limited to 700 copies on 12" Gatefold vinyl, and 700 copies on CD. They called it a, "wee pit stop" on the way to a full album. April 2016, Startracks began to re-release Tiger Lou, Araki, and Las Puertas albums on multiple mediums. Following the re-releases, Startracks announced the first single from their album, "The Wound Dresser" May 20, 2016 called, "Leap of Love."

On September 23, 2016 Tiger Lou released their fourth studio album titled, "The Wound Dresser". Stating in a Q&A video February 23, 2017 Rasmus Kellerman stated, 

The band is set to release the single, "Every Battle Alike" April 22, 2017.

References

External links
Official website
Videointerview, "Nixon" and "The Loyal" live
www.RasmusKellerman.com

SOLID PR: Out Today! Paint It Black * 5ive * Hayaino Daisuki * Tiger Lou!
Review: Tiger Lou – Debaser Medis, Stockholm – Dec 21, 2013

Tiger Lou